Li Zhensheng (born February 25, 1931) is a Chinese geneticist who specializes in the genetics of wheat. He is an academician of the Chinese Academy of Sciences and was awarded the Highest Science and Technology Award in 2006.

Biography 
Mr. Li was born in Zibo, Shandong. In 1951, he graduated from Shandong Agricultural University and worked in Yangling (Institute of Soil and Water Conservation, Chinese Academy of Sciences, now Northwest A&F University) for over 30 years.

In an interview, he said that three scientists influenced him very much, they are Hua Luogeng (for telling him how to learn), Qian Sanqiang (how to do research) and Ai Siqi (Historical Materialism and Dialectical Materialism).

Work 
In Li's scientific career, he has made three notable contributions to wheat genetics and wide-hybridization between common wheat and Thinopyrum ponticum. The wheat cultivars have greatly enhanced productivity of wheat. Among them, Xiaoyan 6 has been widely grown in China. This has enabled him to propose a creative methodology for producing wheat substitution lines through nullisomic backcrossing. This kind of breeding needs less natural resources, and it protects the environment which is good for the sustainable development in Chinese agriculture.

Awards and honors 
 In 1983, First-class Prize of Sci-tech Advance Award by the People's Government of Shanxi province of China
 In 1985, First-class Prize of National Invention by the Ministry of Science and Technology of China
 In 1988, Tan Kah Kee Prize in Agricultural Science by Tan Kah Kee Foundation
 In 1990, Fellow, the Third World Academy of Sciences
 In 1978, National Scientific Conference Prize
 In 1979, National model worker
 In 1993, Academician, Chinese Academy of Sciences
 In 1995, Ho Leung Ho Lee Sci-tech Prize in Agricultural Science, awarded by Ho Leung Ho Lee Foundation in Hong Kong
 In 2005, China Agriculture Elite Award by the Ministry of Agriculture of China
 In 2006, Li won the Highest Science and Technology Award of China.
 In 2010, asteroid 90825 Lizhensheng, discovered by the Beijing Schmidt CCD Asteroid Program in 1995, was named in his honor. The official  was published by the Minor Planet Center on September 23, 2010.

References 
 

1931 births
Living people
Biologists from Shandong
Chinese geneticists
Educators from Shandong
Shandong Agricultural University alumni
Members of the Chinese Academy of Sciences
Academic staff of the Northwest A&F University
People from Zibo